Xestoquinone is a bio-active isolate of the marine sponge Xestospongia.

References

Oxygen heterocycles
Quinones
Triketones
Heterocyclic compounds with 5 rings
Enones